Volume 9, also known as 10th Anniversary album, is the ninth studio album of South Korean boy band Shinhwa. It was released on 3 April 2008 by Good Entertainment, marking the group's 10th anniversary. It was first released as a First Press Limited Edition, with 50,000 copies, each with a hologram serial number and a 120-page photobook. The regular edition was released a week later. A 20,000 copies repackaged White Edition was released on 3 July 2008, which included new track, "Destiny of Love" (흔적) and a music video which feature footage from their Shinhwa Must Go On: 10th Anniversary Live concert held on 29 and 30 March 2008 at the Olympic Gymnastics Arena, Seoul.

"One More Time" (다시 한번만), a ballad track, was the lead track to be released, as a digital single on 24 March 2008. "Run" was the next track to be released with a promotional music video.

Tracks 
Information is adapted from the liner notes of Volume 9:

Music videos
 "Run"
 "Destiny of Love" - feature footage from Shinhwa Must Go On: 10th Anniversary Live concert in Seoul

Charts
Shinhwa did limited promotional activities for this album, due to members' solo activities, and it sold over 100,000 copies in the first month. It was ranked 1st in album sales for the April monthly chart, but did not chart in May; and it charted at #25 in June and #3 in July.

Release history

Personnel
Information is adapted from the liner notes of Volume 9:
 Park Kwon-young - producer
 Lee Jang-eon - producer
 Shinhwa - producer
 Kang Bong-gu - producer
 Park Hyeok - sound engineer
 Jeon Hoon - mastering engineer
 Jeong Ku-hyeon - guitar ("Voyage")
 Sam Lee - guitar ("Just One More Time", "2 Ma Luv...", "So In Love")
 Ko Tae-young - guitar ("Run", "An Unfinished Story")
 K-Strings - strings ("Voyage")
 Kim Jae-seok - piano, keyboard ("Just One More Time", "2 Ma Luv...")

References

2007 albums
Shinhwa albums
Warner Music Group albums